is a Japanese footballer currently playing as a defender for Kagoshima United.

Club career
Hamaguchi made his professional debut in a 0–6 Emperor's Cup loss against Avispa Fukuoka.

Career statistics

Club
.

Notes

References

1998 births
Living people
People from Fukutsu, Fukuoka
Association football people from Fukuoka Prefecture
National Institute of Fitness and Sports in Kanoya alumni
Japanese footballers
Association football defenders
Avispa Fukuoka players
Kagoshima United FC players